Roger Alden (February 11, 1754 – November 5, 1836) graduated from Yale in 1773, and served in the American Revolutionary War as an aide to General Nathanael Greene. He served as a lieutenant in the Connecticut Line, and was promoted to captain of the Second Connecticut Regiment on September 1, 1779. He continued to serve in the army until February 10, 1781. Alden studied law in the office of William Samuel Johnson (1727-1819) and served as deputy secretary to the Continental Congress from 1785 until 1789, when he joined the State Department as chief clerk to the domestic department. He worked as an agent of the Holland Land county from 1795 to 1825 and as ordnance storekeeper at West Point from 1825 until his death.

References

External links

1754 births
1836 deaths
Yale College alumni
Continental Army officers from Connecticut
Chief Clerks of the United States Department of State